The 8140 was a diesel engine made by Sofim for automobiles. Originally introduced as a swirl chamber, naturally aspirated diesel it was mostly used in commercial vehicles worldwide.

Turbocharging the original engine, the design of which was finished in 1974, was impeded until 1985 due to restrictions of the original design. Heat flux issues with the aluminium head and swirl chambers were eventually overcome, but did slow down development.

First direct injection models also appeared in the mid-eighties.

Additionally to the Fiat designation 8140 some engines got a Renault tag (S8 for indirect injection, S9 for direct injection).

2.0 L version 
In the early beginning there was a 2.0-liter (1,995 cc) four-cylinder 65 PS (48 kW), called the Sofim 8144.65. Alongside the 2.4-liter version it was used in light commercial vehicles like the Saviem SG2, OM Grinta, and the Fiat/Iveco Daily, as well as passenger cars like the Fiat 131 and 132 models. It also saw use in the Fiat Campagnola.

2.4 L version
The original 2.4 L big block displaces , bore x stroke was 93 x 90 mm.

2.5 L version
In 1990 the 2.5 L was introduced with a longer stroke, increased by 2 mm to 92 mm. The bore remained unchanged at 93 mm, this version displaces .

2.8 L version
The 2.8 L displaces 2800 cc having a larger bore and stroke (94.4 x 100 mm).

Today 
After continuous development these engines are nowadays known as F1A (2.3 L) and F1C (3.0 L), available for marine and industrial use from Fiat Powertrain Technologies (FPT) and CNH Industrial (since 2012) respectively.

References

Renault engines
Fiat engines
PSA engines
Diesel engines by model